The St. Mary's River is a river in Nova Scotia, Canada. It runs through Guysborough County, Antigonish County, Halifax Regional Municipality, Colchester County and Pictou County of Nova Scotia and drains into the Atlantic Ocean at Sonora, Nova Scotia. It offers important Atlantic salmon habitat and the riverbanks are a habitat for the wood turtle.

The largest lakes, all on the East and North branches, are the Lochaber, Lochiel, Eden and Archibald's Mills Lakes.

Named Rivère Isle Verte by explorer Samuel de Champlain, the current name is from Fort Saint Marie, a French-built fort which was later taken over and destroyed by the British. There was also a Fort Saint Charles on the river nearby; both were 17th century forts. Atlantic salmon, an endangered species, inhabit the river. There are efforts under way by the Nova Scotia Nature Trust to protect ecologically important lands along the river.

See also
List of rivers of Nova Scotia

References

Landforms of Guysborough County, Nova Scotia
Landforms of Pictou County
Rivers of Nova Scotia